The Employment Equality (Religion or Belief) Regulations 2003 is a plank of United Kingdom labour law designed to combat discrimination in relation to people's religion or belief, or absence of religion or belief. They were introduced in order to comply with the European Union Directive 2000/78/EC and complement similar measures on sexuality, age, disability, race and gender discrimination. The EU Directive in turn is similar to legislation passed in the United States.

The Regulations have been revoked by, and the substantive provisions included in, the Equality Act 2010.

Provisions
The main provisions of the regulations are to make direct and indirect discrimination against an employee or potential employee on the grounds of religion unlawful.  They also make it unlawful to discriminate by way of victimization, or to harass an employee on grounds of religious belief.  The regulations also extend to cover providers and of vocational training in relation to those undergoing training for any employment, and to those acting as employment agencies and giving careers advice.

There are exceptions for genuine occupational requirements, for national security, and for positive discrimination for overcoming disadvantages pertaining to adherents of a religious belief or to encourage religious adherents to take advantage of opportunities for work.

A special clause protects Sikhs from requirements pertaining to the wearing of safety helmets.

Case law
McClintock v. Department of Constitutional Affairs
Redfearn v. Serco
Jivraj v Hashwani [2010] EWCA Civ 712
McFarlane v Relate Avon Ltd [2010] EWCA Civ 880

See also
UK employment discrimination law
UK labour law
Human Rights Act 1998

Notes

External links
 Statutory Instrument 2003 No. 1660, The Employment Equality (Religion or Belief) Regulations 2003, full text at the official Office of Public Sector Information website.

United Kingdom labour law
Anti-discrimination law in the United Kingdom
Human rights in the United Kingdom
Statutory Instruments of the United Kingdom
2003 in British law
2003 in religion